The legislative districts of Sarangani are the representations of the province of Sarangani in the Congress of the Philippines. The province is currently represented in the lower house of the Congress through its lone congressional district.

History 

Prior to gaining separate representation, areas now under the jurisdiction of Sarangani were represented under the Department of Mindanao and Sulu (1917–1935), the undivided province of Cotabato (1935–1967), Region XI (1978–1984) and South Cotabato (1967–1972; 1984–1995).

The passage of Republic Act No. 7228 on March 16, 1992 and its subsequent ratification by plebiscite on November 28, 1992 separated the entire third district of South Cotabato to form the new province of Sarangani. South Cotabato's former third district automatically became the representation of Sarangani upon its establishment in 1992, but the new province only elected a representative under its own name beginning in 1995.

Lone District 
Population (2020): 558,946

Notes

See also 
Legislative district of Mindanao and Sulu
Legislative district of Cotabato
Legislative districts of South Cotabato

References 

Sarangani
Politics of Sarangani